Tosapusia kurodai is a species of sea snail, a marine gastropod mollusk, in the family Costellariidae, the ribbed miters.

Description
The length of the shell attains 32.3 mm.

Distribution
This species occurs in the following locations:
 New Caledonia
 Papua New Guinea
 Philippines
 Japan

References

External links
 Sakurai K. & Habe T. (1964). Descriptions of two new vexillid species dedicated to Dr. Kuroda's 77th birthday. Venus. 23(1): 29-33, pl. 2.

Costellariidae
Gastropods described in 1964